Corophium volutator is a species of amphipod crustacean in the family Corophiidae. It is found in mudflats of the northern Atlantic Ocean. It is native to the north-east Atlantic Ocean, and has been introduced to the north-west Atlantic.

Description
The head bear two pairs of antennae, the first of which are small and point forwards, while the distinctive second pair are much longer and thicker.

Life cycle
There are 1–2 generations per year, and the females brood the eggs inside their brood pouch or marsupium. They can occur in huge quantities: up to 60,000 per square metre have been observed.

References

Corophiidea
Crustaceans of the Atlantic Ocean
Crustaceans described in 1766
Taxa named by Peter Simon Pallas